Melica hitchcockii is a species of grass that can be found in Waterton Lakes Park of Alberta, Canada where it grows in a forest about 0.5 miles east of Cameron Lake at the elevation of .

Description
The main panicle branches are indistinct, almost racemose and carry a few spikelets.

Both the upper and lower glumes are keelless, lanceolate, and are membranous with the acute apex only present with the upper glume. Its rachilla internodes are covered with soft hairs.

References

hitchcockii
Flora of Alberta
Flora without expected TNC conservation status